Selwyn is a historic home located near Mechanicsville, Hanover County, Virginia. It was built about 1820 and expanded in the 1850s. It is a large -story, five bay, frame I-house dwelling in a combination of the Federal and Greek Revival styles. The house sits on a brick foundation, has a gable roof with dormers, and exterior end chimneys. Also on the property is a contributing frame dairy.

It was listed on the National Register of Historic Places in 2003.

References

Houses on the National Register of Historic Places in Virginia
Federal architecture in Virginia
Greek Revival houses in Virginia
Houses completed in 1820
Houses in Hanover County, Virginia
National Register of Historic Places in Hanover County, Virginia